Eupithecia orbaria is a moth in the family Geometridae first described by Charles Swinhoe in 1904. It is found in Kenya.

References

Endemic moths of Kenya
Moths described in 1904
orbaria
Moths of Africa